Elizabeth Isabella Spence (12 January 1768 – 27 July 1832) was a Scottish novelist and travel writer.

Life
Spence was born in Dunkeld in 1768 and after being orphaned she went to live with an aunt and uncle in London, but they also died and she had to quickly turn her hobby of writing into a means of income. Her uncle was James Fordyce, who was the author of Sermons to Young Women, and her work was said to reflect this moral approach. She initially wrote sentimental fiction but then turned her attention to travel writing.

Her approach was to travel during summer composing letters and anecdotes about her travels which she then later edited into a book. She is sometimes noted because she sent notes to other women writers of the time. Spence's travel writing attracted some criticism in her lifetime, but Pam Perkins has commented that Spence emphasised that inspirational effect that the Scottish landscape could have on women in the time. Spence witnessed the countryside being opened up and she made literary references where the scenery was mentioned in contemporary culture like the novels of Sir Walter Scott.

Spence died in Chelsea in 1832 of a stroke.

Works
 The Nobility of the Heart, 1804
 The Wedding Day, 1807
 Summer Excursions through part of England and Wales, 1809
 Sketches of the Present Manners, Custom, and Scenery of Scotland, 1811
 Commemorative Feelings, 1812
 The Curate and his Daughter: a Cornish Tale, 1813
 The Spanish Guitar, 1815
 A Traveller's Tale of the Last Century, 1819
 Old Stories, 1822
 How to be rid of a Wife, 1823
 Dame Rebecca Berry, 1827
 Tales of Welsh Society and Scenery

References

1768 births
1832 deaths
People from Perth and Kinross
Scottish women novelists
Scottish travel writers
British women travel writers
19th-century Scottish writers
19th-century British women writers
19th-century British writers